Operation Solstice, also known as Unternehmen Husarenritt or the Stargard tank battle, was one of the last German armoured offensive operations on the Eastern Front in World War II.

It was originally planned as a major offensive but was executed as a limited attack, due to hasty planning by the Germans and it being partially compromised by Soviet military intelligence. Intended to relieve the city of Küstrin, Sonnenwende was launched on 15 February 1945 from Stargard, Pomerania. By 18 February, the Soviet 1st Belorussian Front led by Georgy Zhukov had defeated the attack, prompting the Germans to call off the offensive. Despite its failure, the operation had forced Soviet High Command (Stavka) to postpone the planned attack on Berlin from February to April, focusing forces on the East Pomeranian Offensive, launched on 24 February and not concluded until 4 April.

Planning

The operation took place in response to the Soviet advance on Berlin in early 1945. Launched January 12, 1945, the Soviet Vistula-Oder Offensive had ripped open a gap hundreds of kilometers long in German defensive lines, and the Soviets had subsequently pushed from the Vistula River to the Oder River. As the Soviet advance to the west reached its farthest point, its apex narrowed, leaving long northern and southern flanks into which retreating German formations had moved and along which the Germans were attempting to reestablish a cohesive defensive line.

General Heinz Guderian had originally planned to execute a major offensive against the 1st Belorussian Front, cutting off the leading elements of Georgy Zhukov's forces east of the Oder. The Soviet forces were to be attacked from Stargard (Pomerania) in the north as well as from Glogau (Silesia) and Guben (Brandenburg) in the south. In order to carry out these plans, he requested that the Courland Pocket be evacuated to make available the divisions trapped there, removed troops from Italy and Norway, and involved Sepp Dietrich's 6th Panzer Army which had been intended for counter-attacks in Hungary. In a meeting with Guderian Hitler insisted that Courland be held and that the army continue with its planned attacks in Hungary; the meeting rapidly degenerated into a heated and farcical argument.

After agreeing on a more limited counter-offensive, Hitler and Guderian then proceeded to have an even more heated argument when Guderian insisted that Walther Wenck direct the offensive rather than Heinrich Himmler (the commander of Army Group Vistula). Hitler, despite "almost screaming", according to Guderian's account, gave in on this point.

Operational goals
In its final form, Operation Solstice consisted of a more limited counter-attack than had been originally planned by the three corps of the Eleventh SS Panzer Army, which was being assembled in Pomerania, against the spearheads of the 1st Belorussian Front. The German forces would first attack along a fifty-kilometre front around Stargard south-eastwards towards Arnswalde where a small garrison had been encircled with their ultimate objective being the relief of Küstrin.

The Wehrmacht originally codenamed the operation Husarenritt, but the SS insisted on the name Sonnenwende.

Soviet intelligence

Zhukov had been made aware of a buildup of German forces opposing his 61st and 2nd Guards Tank Armies, but did not have information as to the exact timing and nature of the attack. The Stavka of the Supreme Main Command had noted with concern that while the Germans had moved thirteen divisions between the main Soviet forces and Berlin, thirty-three divisions had concentrated in Pomerania, lending credence to the possibility of a German strike from Pomerania into the exposed northern flank of the 1st Belorussian Front.

Deployments

Wehrmacht

Over 1200 tanks were allocated to the offensive, but no trains were available to transport them. In addition, due to serious shortages, only three days' ammunition and fuel were immediately available. German forces had also suffered heavy losses during the January combat in East Prussia and Poland. German sources admitted to 198,000 dead and missing for the first two months of 1945 in the region between the Baltic Sea and the Carpathian Mountains.

Soviet sources state that operations by the 1st Ukrainian and Belorussian Fronts during the Vistula-Oder Offensive alone resulted in the deaths of 150,000 German troops. In Deutsche militärische Verluste im Zweiten Weltkrieg, author Rüdiger Overmans estimates overall German military deaths in January 1945 were 451,742 (p. 239) and believes up to 2/3 of these losses (some 300,000) occurred in combat on the eastern front (p. 265). While the Germans were able to make good some of the losses through measures such as the mass mobilization of Volkssturm, the German forces in the east had clearly suffered both significant quantitative and qualitative losses as a result of the two Soviet major offensives in January 1945.

Red Army

While the 1st and 2nd Belorussian Fronts were impressively large formations, the Soviet forces had also suffered serious losses in the Vistula-Oder Offensive. At the beginning of February 1945, the strength of rifle divisions in the 1st BRF averaged around 4,000 troops and those of the 2nd BRF between 3,000 - 4,000. Soviet army strength was further weakened by the need to besiege encircled groups of German soldiers (Festungen - German: "fortresses") in Elbing, Poznan, Deutsch-Krone, and Schneidemühl. Armored strength was also weakened by the recent offensive operations; the 2nd BRF fielded only 297 well-worn tanks early in February 1945. During the period January 12 - February 3, 1945, the 1st BRF suffered 77,342 casualties (7.5% of its assigned strength) while during the East Prussian Offensive of January 13 - February 10, 1945, the 2nd BRF took 159,490 casualties (18% of assigned strength). In the same periods, the 1st Belorussian and Ukrainian Fronts lost 1,267 armored fighting vehicles while the 2nd and 3rd Belorussian Fronts lost 3,525. Gun and mortar losses for the two groups of fronts were 374 and 1,644, respectively. To compound their difficulties, the Soviets faced supply bottlenecks as well as increased German air activity, resulting in increased unit requests for anti-aircraft weapons.

The offensive

Not all of the German units, which had to be reinforced across the bridges at Stettin were ready on the planned start date of February 15. Nevertheless, a part of the central corps, the SS Division Nordland, attacked towards Arnswalde that day. Initially the offensive was successful; the opposing forces of 61st Army were taken by surprise and the German spearhead reached the besieged outpost of Arnswalde and relieved its garrison.

A general attack opened the following day. The central corridor to Arnswalde was widened by the III SS Panzer Corps, pushing part of the Soviet front eight to twelve kilometers back. However, the attack by the XXXIX Panzer Corps was unable to reach the Plöne Lake due to resistance by the Soviet 2nd Guards Tank Army, stalling some 70 kilometers from Küstrin after pushing the Soviets out of Sallenthin and Muscherin, reoccupying some land on the eastern shore of Lake Madü, and recapturing Pyritz. Gruppe Munzel pushed some four kilometers to Liebenow, while the III SS Panzer Corps advanced about a kilometer to Reetz. Numbers of Soviet tanks and antitank guns were destroyed by German Tiger II heavy tanks, but the German heavy tanks also took losses. In general, German progress was hindered because of strong Soviet resistance.
On February 17, General Wenck, commander of the offensive, was seriously injured in a car accident. While being driven back from a briefing in Berlin, he took over driving from his driver (who had been on duty and awake for 48 hours) and then himself fell asleep at the wheel. He was replaced by Hans Krebs, but command initiative had already been lost. Later that day, Zhukov threw the 3rd Shock Army, which had redeployed from the area of Jastrow, into a counter-attack and the German offensive stalled.

Army Group Vistula halted Sonnenwende on February 18. On February 19, Zhukov initiated a counter-offensive aimed at the capture of Stettin using the 61st and the 2nd Guards Tank Armies as well as the 7th Guards Cavalry Corps. However, it stalled in the heavy street fighting during the re-capture of Arnswalde. There was no immediate German withdrawal, but the German command decided on February 21 to withdraw the headquarters of the XXXIX Panzer Corps as well as the Führer-Grenadier, Führer-Begleit, Holstein, and 10th SS Panzer Divisions westward behind Army Group Center, practically ensuring that eastern Pomerania would fall to the Soviets. Zhukov's commitment of the 70th Army into an attack on February 23 spurred a retreat with the German forces losing or abandoning many tanks.

Outcome
Despite the initial gains, the operation was a complete failure. However, the operation convinced the Soviets to postpone their attack on Berlin while Pomerania was cleared in the East Pomeranian Offensive.

See also
History of Pomerania (1933–1945)

Footnotes
Citations

References
Beevor, Antony. Berlin: The Downfall 1945, Penguin Books, 2002, 
Duffy, Christopher. Red Storm on the Reich: The Soviet March on Germany, 1945, Routledge, 1991, 
Erickson, John. The Road to Berlin, New Haven: Yale University Press, 1999, 
Jentz, Thomas. Panzertruppen, Vol. 2, Atglen: Schiffer Publishing Ltd., 1996, 
Krivosheev, Grigoriy. Soviet casualties and combat losses, London: Greenhill Books, 1997, 
Lakowski, Richard. Das Deutsche Reich und der Zweite Weltkrieg, Vol. 10/1, Stuttgart: Deutsche Verlags-Anstalt, 2008, 

Overmans, Rüdiger. Deutsche militärische Verluste im Zweiten Weltkrieg, München: R. Oldenbourg Verlag, 2004, 
Schramm, Percy. Kriegstagesbuch des Oberkommandos der Wehrmacht 1944-1945, Vol. II, München: Bernard and Graefe Verlag, 1982 
Stoves, Rolf. Die Gepanzerten und motorisierten deutschen Grossverbände 1935-1945, Wölfersheim: Podzun-Pallas Verlag, 1994, 
Le Tissier, Tony. Zhukov at the Oder: the decisive battle for Berlin, Greenwood Publishing Group, 1996, p. 101, 
Ustinov, Dmitriy. Geschichte des zweiten Weltkrieges 1939-1945, (German translation of the official Soviet history of World War II), Vol. 10, Berlin: Militärverlag der Deutschen Demokratischen Republik, 1982

External links
 Satellite imagery view of the battle area
 Aerial photo of the region around Pyritz
 Lage Ost map for 15 February 1945 showing the German offensive

Battles involving the Soviet Union
Military operations of World War II involving Germany
Battles and operations of the Soviet–German War
February 1945 events in Europe
1945 in Germany